Hans "Yngve" Stoor (5 April 1912 – 3 October 1985) was a Swedish singer, lyricist and composer. One of his most famous recordings is the 1945 Christmas song "Sjömansjul på Hawaii".

References 

1912 births
1985 deaths
Swedish male composers
20th-century Swedish male singers
20th-century classical musicians
20th-century composers